Judith Lee Ivey (born September 4, 1951) is an American actress and theatre director. She twice won the Tony Award for Best Featured Actress in a Play: for Steaming (1981) and Hurlyburly (1984). She has appeared in several films and television series. For her role in What the Deaf Man Heard (1997), she was nominated for a Primetime Emmy Award for Outstanding Supporting Actress in a Limited Series or Movie.

Early life
Ivey was born on September 4, 1951 in El Paso, Texas, the daughter of Nathan Aldean Ivey, a college instructor and dean, and Dorothy Lee (née Lewis), a teacher.

From 1965 to 1968, she attended Union High School through tenth grade in Dowagiac, Michigan. She graduated from Marion High School in Marion, Illinois in 1970, and she attended John A. Logan College, Southern Illinois University (Carbondale), and Illinois State University (Normal, Illinois).

Career
Ivey won two Tony Awards as Best Featured Actress in a Play for Steaming in 1983 and Hurlyburly in 1985. She was nominated for Park Your Car in Harvard Yard in 1992 and a revival of The Heiress in 2013. Other Broadway theatre credits include Piaf, Bedroom Farce, Blithe Spirit, Voices in the Dark, and Follies.

She portrayed Amanda in The Glass Menagerie at the Long Wharf Theatre and reprised the role in March 2010 at the Roundabout Theatre in New York, as well as the Mark Taper Forum in Los Angeles. She received the Lucille Lortel Award for Best Actress for that portrayal. Ivey portrayed Ann Landers in the solo play The Lady with All the Answers at the Cherry Lane Theatre (off-Broadway) in October 2009. She was nominated for Best Solo Performance for the Lucille Lortel Award and Drama Desk Award. In 2016, she returned to the Cherry Lane Theatre in Israel Horovitz's play Out Of The Mouths Of Babes with Estelle Parsons, directed by Barnet Kellman.

Ivey has appeared in numerous films, including Brighton Beach Memoirs, Miles from Home, Compromising Positions, Harry & Son, The Woman in Red, Sister, Sister, In Country, Hello Again, The Lonely Guy, There Goes the Neighborhood, The Devil's Advocate, What Alice Found, and Flags of Our Fathers. 

Despite a long history of theater and film performances, Ivey often is associated with the role of B.J. Poteet in the final season of Designing Women. She appeared on Will & Grace as the mother of Dr. Leo Markus and appeared on Grey's Anatomy, Person of Interest, White Collar, Nurse Jackie, Big Love, and Law & Order: Special Victims Unit. 

Other television roles include starring roles as Kate McCrorey in the 1990–1991 series Down Home, set in a Texas coastal town, Alexandra Buchanan in the short-lived series The 5 Mrs. Buchanans, and "Buddies" with Dave Chappelle. Ivey was also in the 1985 TV remake of The Long Hot Summer, in the role of Noel Varner (Joanne Woodward's role in the 1958 film version). The miniseries also starred Jason Robards and Don Johnson. Ivey was nominated for an Emmy for her performance in What the Deaf Man Heard, a Hallmark Hall of Fame presentation. She also provided the voice of Eleanor Sherman in the animated series The Critic. Ivey appeared in the television miniseries Rose Red (with a screenplay by Stephen King) as Cathy, one of the psychics investigating a haunted house.

Personal life
Ivey was married to actor Ricardo Gutierrez. They divorced before her move to New York. She is now married to Tim Braine, and they have two children.

Filmography

Film

Television

References

External links

1951 births
20th-century American actresses
21st-century American actresses
Actresses from El Paso, Texas
Actresses from Illinois
Actresses from Michigan
American film actresses
American stage actresses
American television actresses
American theatre directors
Women theatre directors
Audiobook narrators
Drama Desk Award winners
Illinois State University alumni
John A. Logan College alumni
Living people
People from Dowagiac, Michigan
People from Marion, Illinois
Southern Illinois University Carbondale alumni
Tony Award winners